Jilliby State Conservation Area is a protected area located north west of the Central Coast, New South Wales in  eastern Australia. A popular area for recreation, including bush walking, four wheel driving, picnics and horse riding. Birdwatching enthusiasts can enjoy watching over 130 species of birds here.

Jilliby State has an important cultural and historical role for the Aboriginal people.

References

State conservation areas in New South Wales

Forests of New South Wales